Pilanesberg International Airport  is an airport serving Sun City in the North West province of South Africa. It is located adjacent to the Pilanesberg National Park.

Facilities

Communication
The Communication Frequency for Pilanesberg International Airport is 118.40 MHz.
Runway lights can be activated by making 3-7 clicks on 118.40 MHz.
The control tower can be contacted on +27 (0)14 55 22154.

Nearby airports
 Lanseria International Airport
 Rustenburg Airfield

See also
 Pilanesberg
 Pilanesberg National Park
 Sun City

References

External links
 Pilanesberg International Airport at Airports Company South Africa
 Private website about Pilanesberg International Airport
 
 
 

Airports in South Africa
Transport in North West (South African province)
Buildings and structures in North West (South African province)
Moses Kotane Local Municipality